Joyce Catherine Clifford (September 12, 1935 – October 21, 2011) was a founder of the primary nursing model which was later applied to many hospitals because it reduced medical errors and improved survival rates.

Early life and education
Clifford was born as Joyce Catherine Hoyt in New Haven, Connecticut in 1935. She was one of four daughters of Raymond Hoyt, an ironworker, and his wife, Helen. Hoyt obtained her Ph.D. in health planning from Brandeis University and following it, got her nursing diploma from Hospital of Saint Raphael. In 1959 she obtained her Bachelor of Science degree from Saint Anselm College, New Hampshire. Her later studies were interrupted because she joined the United States Air Force in 1960s and only by mid 1960s resumed her studying. During her military service with the United States Air Force Nurse Corps, Hoyt was assigned to Air University at Maxwell Air Force Base. She retired from the military with the rank of major. In 1968, Hoyt received a master's degree, with specialization in nursing administration from the University of Alabama at Birmingham.

Career
Clifford began working as chief nurse at Beth Israel Deaconess Medical Center in 1974, under guidance from Mitchell T. Rabkin who at that time was president and chief executive of Beth Israel Hospital and member of the Harvard Medical School faculty. Following her internship, she introduced primary nursing model after one year of working there in order to improve patient care and increase nurse retention. In 1991 she founded the Institute for Nursing Healthcare Leadership, to promote and advance education in nursing and the primary nurse system. Prior to her death, she already was serving as vice-president for nursing and nurse-in-chief at Beth Israel. In 2005, Clifford was named a Living Legend of the American Academy of Nursing. She received the Living Legend in Massachusetts Nursing award from the Massachusetts Association of Registered Nurses two years later.

Death
Clifford died from heart disease and kidney failure on October 21, 2011 in Boston, Massachusetts. She was married to Lawrence Clifford for 44 years.

References

1935 births
2011 deaths
Brandeis University alumni
Saint Anselm College alumni
University of Alabama at Birmingham alumni
Deaths from kidney failure
American women nurses
People from New Haven, Connecticut
United States Air Force Nurse Corps officers
20th-century American naval officers
Air University (United States Air Force) faculty